SS Dominator, a freighter, ran ashore on the Palos Verdes Peninsula in the South Bay area of California in 1961 due to a navigational error while lost in fog. Its remains can still be seen today, and serves as a point of interest for hikers and kayakers.

Ship history
The ship was originally the American Liberty ship Melville Jacoby, built during World War II at the Walsh-Kaiser Company shipyard in Providence, Rhode Island, and launched on 31 March 1944. It was named after the journalist Melville Jacoby, who after reporting on the war in China, and narrowly escaping capture at Corregidor, was killed in an air crash in 1942.

During the war the ship was operated by the Wilmore Steamship Company of Boston, on behalf of the War Shipping Administration. In 1947 she was sold into commercial service, and flying the Panamanian flag, was renamed SS Victoria. She changed hands in 1950, and was renamed SS North Queen, then again in 1953 and became SS Dominator.

The wreck

On March 13, 1961, Dominator was en route to Los Angeles from Vancouver with a cargo of wheat and beef, when she ran aground off Palos Verdes, California. For two days, the Coast Guard and tugboats attempted to refloat her, but heavy seas and high winds only forced her higher onto the rocks. After two days the crew abandoned ship. The stranded ship was then auctioned, and hull and cargo were sold separately, which led to some conflict between the salvors, as they attempted to gain what they could. Eventually, the ship slowly broke up under the pounding of the waves, and large pieces of wreckage are still scattered over the shore.

References

External links

 A Short Hike Featuring the Dominator
 US Coast Guard List of Disaster Shipwrecks
 Images from a Hike to the Wreckage of SS Dominator
 In-depth article, images, and videos of 1961 Dominator crash activity

1944 ships
Liberty ships
maritime incidents in 1961
shipwrecks of the California coast